William Larkin may refer to:

 William Larkin (painter) (died 1619), English painter
 William J. Larkin Jr. (1928–2019), American politician
 William John Larkin (died 1885), New Zealand priest, Irish nationalist and newspaper proprietor
 William Thomas Larkin (1923–2006), American Roman Catholic bishop
 Billy Stiles or William Larkin (1871–1908), American outlaw in the Old West